Eleanor Flexner (October 4, 1908 – March 25, 1995) was an American  distinguished independent scholar and pioneer in what was to become the field of women's studies. Her much praised Century of Struggle: The Woman's Rights Movement in the United States, originally published in 1959, relates women's physically courageous and politically ingenious work for the vote to other 19th- and early 20th-century social, labor, and reform movements, most importantly the push for equal education, the abolition of slavery, and temperance laws.

Family
Flexner was the younger of two highly intelligent daughters of well-known parents. Her mother, Anne Crawford Flexner (1874-1955), a successful playwright and children's author, organized professional playwrights into an association that later became the Dramatists Guild of the Author's League of America.

Eleanor's father, Abraham Flexner (1866-1959), was a leader in several fields including, with his brother Simon Flexner at the Rockefeller Institute, the reform of early 20th-century medical education and medical research in the United States and Canada. Abraham founded and served as first director of the Institute for Advanced Study in Princeton, New Jersey. His ideas for the structure and purpose of the institute so appealed to theoretical physicist Albert Einstein that Einstein chose it over competing university appointments when he emigrated from Germany to the United States in 1933.

Eleanor's sister, Jean Flexner, became one of the first employees of the Division of Labor Standards in Washington, DC.

Encouragement and financial assistance from her parents carried Flexner through the Great Depression and gave her the means to experiment as a playwright and social organizer. Her mother at her death left Eleanor a lifetime income. Both Anne and Abraham Flexner were feminists who supported passage of the Nineteenth Amendment to the United States Constitution and both marched in the 1915 New York woman suffrage parade.

Career
Eleanor Flexner was born in Georgetown, Kentucky, but spent her youth in New York City. A biographical statement in the Schlesinger Library Archives at Harvard University outlines Flexner's early career:

During this period of her life Flexner found her way into New York's radical left. She joined the Communist Party in 1936 and spent several years writing CP articles and pamphlets, under pseudonyms, and working for various social and political causes.  As a member of the League of American Writers, she served on its Keep America Out of War Committee in January 1940 during the period of the Hitler-Stalin pact.  She worked alongside the National Association of Colored Graduate Nurses. In 1946, she became the executive director of the Congress of American Women This activist background allowed Flexner to appreciate the disappointments, triumphs, and bracing camaraderie experienced by the 19th- and early 20th-century women whom she later described in Century of Struggle.

In the 1940s, Flexner began researching the 19th-century labor struggles of American women but found that few historians had touched on the subject. She was by that time already planning to write a history of the American woman suffrage movement and gradually became convinced that a comprehensive treatment must deal with the experiences of working class women and politically active women of color.  Flexner worked on the manuscript that was to become Century of Struggle through most of the 1950s. Her original publisher, Harper, refused to publish it unless she removed the parts about women of color. Fortunately, when she showed the completed book to the historian Arthur Schlesinger, he recognized its value and urged her to offer it to Harvard University Press, which readily accepted it for publication. It was published in 1959.

Many of the concepts that inform Century of Struggle were developed by a small group of Marxist women — including, in addition to Flexner, Susan B. Anthony II, Gerda Lerner, and Eve Merriam. It was only in 1982, however, that Flexner publicly acknowledged her past membership in the Communist Party.

In 1957, Flexner moved from New York to Northampton, Massachusetts, where her life partner, Helen Terry, was on the faculty of Smith College. Flexner completed Century of Struggle and wrote her last book, Mary Wollstonecraft, in this setting.

Major work
American Playwrights, 1918-1938:  The Theatre Retreats from Reality, (1938, 1966; reprinted in 1969 with a new preface by Eleanor Flexnor).
Century of Struggle: The Women's Rights Movement in the United States, (1959, expanded edition 1975; enlarged edition 1996 co-authored with Ellen Fitzpatrick, who also wrote a biographically valuable foreword).
Mary Wollstonecraft: A Biography (1972).

Capsule summaries of Flexner's books

American Playwrights, 1918-1938: The Theater Retreats From Reality

From Flexner's 1969 preface:

	
Plays evaluated in American Playwrights are by dramatists Sidney Howard, S.N. Behrman, Maxwell Anderson, Eugene O'Neill, by comedy writer George S. Kaufman (variously collaborating with Marc Connelly, Edna Ferber, Moss Hart, Herman Mankiewicz, Morrie Ryskind, Howard Dietz, Katherine Dayton, and others), and by comedy writers George Kelly, Rachel Crothers, Philip Barry, and Robert E. Sherwood.

In the penultimate chapter, "The New Realism," brief attention is given to Susan Glaspell, Arthur Richman, Elmer Rice, Sophie Treadwell, John Howard Lawson, Paul Green, Paul & Claire Sifton, George Sklar & Albert Maltz, Paul Peters & George Sklar, John Wexley, Clifford Odets, Albert Bein, Irwin Shaw, Emanuel Eisenberg, Sidney Kingsley, Marc Blitzstein, and Ben Bengal.

Flexner regrets in her 1969 preface to the book that she did not include Lorraine Hansberry, Arthur Miller, and Lillian Hellman among the playwrights singled out for special notice.

Century of Struggle: The Women's Rights Movement in the United States
Century of Struggle, originally published in 1959, was the first authoritative narrative of the woman's rights movement. It became a point of departure for generations of historians who built the field of women's history. Professor Ellen Carol DuBois (UCLA) wrote in 1991 that Century of Struggle "has stood for thirty years as the most comprehensive history of American feminism up to the enfranchisement of women in 1920."  Ellen Fitzpatrick (University of New Hampshire), another leading scholar and co-author of the 1996 enlarged edition, wrote:

The book covers the woman's rights movement from Anne Hutchinson in the 17th century through the ratification of the Nineteenth Amendment, which ensured women's right to vote. For the book, Flexner interviewed Clara Lemlich Shavelson and the granddaughter of Leonora Barry, and did significant original research in the Library of Congress and the Sophia Smith Collection of Women’s History at Smith College.

Mary Wollstonecraft: A Biography
Mary Wollstonecraft Godwin (1759-1797) was an English feminist, writer, and philosopher. There are at least three sources of her continuing renown in Britain and America: She is the author of A Vindication of the Rights of Woman (1792). She opposed the eminent Edmund Burke's views concerning the French Revolution in her A Vindication of the Rights of Men (1790) and was present in Paris in 1793 when England and France declared war. Finally, she is the mother of Mary Wollstonecraft Godwin Shelley, who wrote Frankenstein, or the Modern Prometheus (1818).

In this classic biography, which has not been reprinted, Flexner recounts the glories and miseries of Wollstonecraft's childhood and professional life. She describes Wollstonecraft's crushing self-doubt and unstable temperament, as well as her capacity for hard work even in times of significant adversity. Drawing on contemporary letters and diaries, Flexner adds new material to earlier lives of Wollstonecraft, especially concerning Wollstonecraft's literary friendships and her relations with her sisters and brothers.

Notes
Thomas Neville Bonner's Iconoclast and Ellen Fitzpatrick's foreword to the 1996 edition of Century of Struggle were the major sources of information about the Flexner family.

Information about Flexner's work history and the development of her ideas comes variously from Kate Weigand's Red Feminism, from the Schlesinger Library Archives, Harvard University, and from Ellen Fitspatrick's foreword to Century of Struggle.

References

Further reading
Thomas Neville Bonner, Iconoclast: Abraham Flexner and a Life in Learning. Johns Hopkins University Press, 2002.
Ellen Carol DuBois, Woman Suffrage and Women's Rights (Chapter 12: "Eleanor Flexner and the History of American Feminism"). New York University Press, 1998.
Kate Weigand, Red Feminism: American Communism and the Making of Women's Liberation (Reconfiguring American Political History). Johns Hopkins University Press, 2001.

External links
Eleanor Flexner in Northampton
Abraham Flexner's extraordinary career  
Difficulty of achieving the vote for women  
Eleanor Flexner Papers. Schlesinger Library, Radcliffe Institute, Harvard University.

1908 births
1995 deaths
Swarthmore College alumni
American people of German-Jewish descent
Feminism and history
People from Georgetown, Kentucky
Writers from New York City
Independent scholars
20th-century American women writers
Kentucky women writers
Activists from Kentucky
Alumni of Somerville College, Oxford
Mary Wollstonecraft scholars